The 2017 season of the 3. divisjon, the fourth highest association football league for men in Norway.

26 games were played in 6 groups, with 3 points given for wins and 1 for draws. 6 group winners were promoted to the 2. divisjon.

League tables

Group 1

Group 2

Group 3

Group 4

Group 5

Group 6

Top scorers

References
NIFS

Norwegian Third Division seasons
4
Norway
Norway